The Roman Catholic Diocese of Houma–Thibodaux is a Latin Church ecclesiastical territory or diocese of the Catholic Church in southeastern Louisiana. It comprises Terrebonne and Lafourche parishes, the eastern part of St. Mary Parish including Morgan City, and Grand Isle in Jefferson Parish.

Although a small diocese in terms of area (around 3,500 square miles), it has a large Catholic population, with approximately 126,000 Catholics out of a total population of 202,000 within the parish boundaries. The diocese includes part of Cajun Louisiana.

History
Pope Paul VI erected the Diocese of Houma-Thibodaux as a diocese with two sees on June 5, 1977, taking its present territory from the Metropolitan Archdiocese of New Orleans and making it a suffragan of the same metropolitan see.  The decree of erection designated the Church of St. Francis de Sales in Houma as the cathedral St. Joseph Church in Thibodaux as the co-cathedral of the new diocese.

Sexual abuse
In January 2019, the Diocese of Houma-Thibodaux released the names of 14 clergy who were accused of committing acts of sex abuse, three of whom were convicted.

Bishops

Bishops of Houma-Thibodaux
 Warren Louis Boudreaux (1977–1992) 
 Charles Michael Jarrell (1992–2002), appointed Bishop of Lafayette in Louisiana
 Sam Jacobs (2003–2013) 
 Shelton Fabre (2013–2022)
 Mario E. Dorsonville (Elect, 2023–)

Other priests of this diocese who became bishops
 Joseph Nunzio Latino, appointed Bishop of Jackson in 2003
 Oscar Azarcon Solis, appointed auxiliary bishop of Los Angeles in 2003

Education
 High schools
 Central Catholic High School, Morgan City (7-12)
 Edward Douglas White Catholic High School, Thibodaux (Grades 8th-12th)
 Vandebilt Catholic High School, Houma (Grades 8th-12th)
 Elementary schools
 Central Catholic Elementary School (formerly Holy Cross Elementary School), Morgan City (grades PreK-5)
 Holy Rosary Catholic School, Larose (Nursery 2-8th)
 Holy Savior Catholic School, Lockport (Nursery 1-5th)
 Saint Bernadette Catholic Elementary School, Houma (PreK3-7th)
 Saint Francis de Sales Cathedral School, Houma (PreK-7th)
 Saint Genevieve Catholic Elementary School, Thibodaux (PreK-7th)
 Saint Gregory Barbarigo Catholic School, Houma (PreK-7th)
 Saint Joseph Catholic Elementary School, Thibodaux (PreK-7th)
 Saint Mary's Nativity School, Raceland (PreK-8th)

Former schools
 Maria Immacolata Catholic School, Houma (Closed in 2020)

See also
 Index of Catholic Church articles
 List of the Catholic dioceses of the United States
 List of Roman Catholic archdioceses (by country and continent)
 List of Roman Catholic dioceses (alphabetical) (including archdioceses)
 List of Roman Catholic dioceses (structured view) (including archdioceses)

References

External links
 Roman Catholic Diocese of Houma–Thibodaux Official Site

Houma-Thibodaux
Houma-Thibodaux
Houma-Thibodaux
Christian organizations established in 1977